Suprachoroidal drug delivery is an ocular route of drug administration. It involves using a microneedle to provide a minimally invasive method and injecting particles of a medication into the suprachoroidal space (SCS) between the sclera and choroid in the eye.

See also
 Suprachoroid lamina

References

Ophthalmic drug administration